Rapid resolution therapy (RRT) is an alternative modality of psychotherapy created by Jon Connelly that aims to resolve mental health and life challenges within a shorter time frame compared to some other therapies. It was originally designed for treating PTSD, survivors of sexual violence, and single-event trauma. There is limited academic research on the efficacy of RRT. Issues addressed by rapid resolution therapy can include anxiety, depression, anger, grief, insomnia, addiction/relapse prevention, phobias, compulsive habits, weight loss issues, and pain management. The RRT process aims to help participants permanently overcome troubling thoughts, emotions, and behaviors in a light-hearted way.

Like many other psychotherapies, RRT does not only target the conscious thinking brain, but also addresses the emotional brain and limbic system, changing how the unconscious mind processes information so that improvements are natural and automatic.  The unconscious mind does not respond immediately to conscious direction but is known to relate and respond quickly to symbols, metaphors, stories, and imagery, so RRT looks to change the neural pathway through specialized tools and techniques.  By working with both the conscious, thinking mind and addressing the deeper part of the mind, RRT can eliminate the emotional charge associated with the particular memory or issue. For treating one issue, the typical RRT process is usually completed within one to three online or in-person meetings.

History 
This form of psychotherapy began with the work of Jon Connelly. Connelly is the founder of the Institute for Survivors of Sexual Violence, a non-profit (501C3) organization.

Prior to providing post-graduate training programs for health and mental health professions, Connelly began his career as a child protective service worker and clinical supervisor. Connelly taught college classes in human sexuality, that provided support to teenagers suffering from childhood abuse, emotional trauma and sexual violence.  As a result of these experiences, he became committed to finding a fast and painless approach to relieve victims from pain and suffering. Insights gained from these events working with victims suffering from emotional trauma helped to shape the formulation of RRT.

The first occurrence of the term  was in Connelly's book Life Changing Conversations with Rapid Resolution Therapy. Connelly gathers twenty-one conversations with individuals suffering from problematic behavioral patterns and their experience with RRT. Connelly states that powerful therapeutic breakthroughs that can dramatically improve one's life can be facilitated in a single psychotherapy session.

Connelly's theory of how rapid transformational change can occur in a single painless session derives from his interpretation of research findings about psychotherapy. Rarely do people expect rapid transformational change when they consider seeing a therapist. However, according to Fernandez Duque, there are strong indications that "Neuroscience founded therapies are leading clinicians to more thriving approaches and leading clients to more thriving states". Connelly states, that when "you move towards a client's neuro psychotherapeutic needs for safety, connection, control, motivation, and self, the end goal will always be an improvement on the prior state".

Process 
RRT is considered a brief therapy and takes place in only one to six sessions. In this approach the aim is to address problematic thoughts, behaviors or emotions in a fast and painless approach that does not require individuals to re-experience or relive the emotional trauma

An estimated 70% of adults in the United States have experienced a traumatic event at least once in their lives and up to 20% of these individuals go on to develop post-traumatic stress disorder (PTSD). Most clinical research studies have shown that to reduce PTSD, the treatment process must include an exposure therapy component. One method employed to help individuals overcome traumatic experiences is "in vivo exposure". This term refers to the direct confrontation of feared objects, activities, or situations by a patient. For example, a woman with PTSD who fears the location where she was assaulted may be assisted by her therapist to attend the location and directly confront those fears. However, research has shown that while exposure works well for simple phobias, forcing traumatized individuals into social situations is ineffective when it fails to adequately address the patient's core fear.

RRT is a gentle process that does not require the patient to relive any painful experiences or talk about them.

Criticisms 
Virtually no empirical research has been published documenting the efficacy or effectiveness of RRT, including relative to other approaches. The indexing service Scopus identifies zero articles in the peer-reviewed literature that reference RRT, while Google Scholar identifies less than 30 articles in the gray literature that reference RRT, consisting primarily of process, commentary and description-based writing.

References 

Psychotherapies
Hypnotherapy